Rahoon-Newcastle GAA is a Gaelic Athletic Association club that takes in an area stretching from Barna to Corcullen (townland on Moycullen-Rahoon parish border) and all the way to Newcastle in Galway City, Ireland. The club was founded in 1889 and is almost exclusively concerned with the game of hurling.

Honours
Galway Junior Hurling Championship
1966
Galway Intermediate Hurling Championship
1977
Galway Under-16 "B" Hurling Championship
1986
Galway Under-21 "C" Hurling Championship
1986
Galway Minor "B" Hurling Championship
1988
Galway Junior "A" Hurling Championship
1992
Galway Under-12 "B" Hurling Championship
1993
Galway Under-14 "C" Hurling Championship
1993
Galway Under-14 "B" Hurling Championship
1995
Galway Under-16 "A2" Championship
1997
Galway Under-12 Championship
1998
Galway Under 21 "B" Hurling Championship (Rahoon-Salthill)
2013
Galway Minor "B" Hurling Championship (Rahoon-Salthill)
2013
Galway Under 16 ''C'' Hurling Championship 
2020

Current Panel
John Hanbury
Tony Óg Regan

References

External links
Rahoon-Newcastle GAA site

Gaelic games clubs in County Galway
Hurling clubs in County Galway